Yuguan may refer to:

Yumen Pass or Yumenguan, frequently abbreviated as Yuguan, pass on the Great Wall in Gansu
Yuguan Township, subdivision of Hui County, Gansu
Yuguan, Hebei, town in and subdivision of Funing County, Hebei